Irrenlohe station is a railway station in the Irrlaching district of the municipality of Schwandorf, located in the Schwandorf district in Bavaria, Germany. It is classified as a category 6 station.

The station emerged with the establishment of the link from Regensburg to Nuremberg. When the branch line to Weiden was added, Irrenlohe became a minor transport hub. As a result the village was shelled in the Second World War. The reason the station is called "Irrenlohe" and not "Irlaching" is that the villagers of Irlaching had shown no real interest in a railway connection and so the building of the station was paid for by Irrenlohe.

The station has five main tracks, of which three are platform tracks. Passenger services are:
 Schwandorf–Regensburg (two-hourly, VBG)
 Weiden-Hof (two-hourly, VBG)

The composer Franz Schreker took the name of his opera Irrelohe ("Mad flames") from the station after his train stopped there.

References

Railway stations in Bavaria
Buildings and structures in Schwandorf (district)